Jesper Jensen (born 5 July 1967) is a Danish boxer. He competed in the men's flyweight event at the 1992 Summer Olympics.

References

External links
 

1967 births
Living people
Danish male boxers
Olympic boxers of Denmark
Boxers at the 1992 Summer Olympics
People from Vordingborg Municipality
Flyweight boxers
Sportspeople from Region Zealand